This is a list of Belgian football transfers for the 2015 summer transfer window. Only transfers involving a team from the Belgian Pro League are listed.

The summer transfer window will open on 1 July 2015, although some transfers were announced prior to that date. Players without a club may join one at any time, either during or in between transfer windows. The transfer window ends on 1 September 2015, although a few completed transfers could still be announced a few days later.

Sorted by date

January 2015

February 2015

March 2015

April 2015

May 2015

End of 2014-15 season
After the end of the 2014–15 season, several players will return from loan to another club or will not have their contracts extended. These will be listed here when the date is otherwise not specified.

June 2015

July 2015

August 2015

September 2015

Sorted by team

Anderlecht

In:

Out:

Charleroi

In:

Out:

Club Brugge

In:

Out:

Genk

In:

Out:

Gent

In:

Out:

Kortrijk

In:

 

 
 
 

 

Out:

Lokeren

In:

Out:

Mechelen

In:

Out:

Mouscron-Péruwelz

In:

Out:

Oostende

In:

Out:

Oud-Heverlee Leuven

In:

 

Out:

Sint-Truiden

In:

Out:

Standard Liège

In:

Out:

Waasland-Beveren

In:

Out:

Westerlo

In:

Out:

Zulte Waregem

In:

Out:

Footnotes

References

Belgian
Transfers Summer
2015 Summer